Matthew Kim (born October 20, 1992), known by his stage name BM or Big Matthew, is a Korean-American rapper, songwriter and composer based in South Korea signed under DSP Media. He is best known for his activities with the South Korean co-ed group Kard. He made his debut as a solo artist on June 9, 2021, with the single "Broken Me".

History

Early life and pre-debut 
BM was born in Los Angeles, California on October 20, 1992. BM moved to South Korea in 2011 in order to audition and take part in the first season of the SBS reality competition show K-pop Star. He entered within the top 50 of the competition, before eventually being eliminated. Due to his then poor Korean language skills, he forgot the lyrics during his audition on several occasions. After K-pop Star, he was recruited by DSP Media. He was featured in Goo Hara's song "La La La" from her 2015 debut EP Alohara (Can You Feel It?) and was her dance partner for the music video and live performances of its lead single "Choco Chip Cookies".

2016-2020: Debut with Kard, Solo activities 
DSP Media first revealed the upcoming debut of its new co-ed group Kard along with its members on December 5, 2016, with a card game-based concept. BM was assigned a role as a "King" card. The group unveiled the first part of its debut project on December 13 with the release of their first single "Oh NaNa", and officially debuted on July 19, 2017, with their first EP Hola Hola.

In November 2018, BM was featured in the eponymous title track for singer Zsun's album I'm On My Wave. In the same month, he also uploaded the self-produced track "Better Myself" on SoundCloud.

On December 6, 2018, he made a guest appearance on the JTBC variety show Shall We Walk Together in celebration of g.o.d's 20th debut anniversary. He appeared alongside Woosung of Snuper and Heochan of Victon, wherein they visited and walked through the Santiago pilgrimage route for three days as they made their way towards g.o.d's dormitory.

In May 2019, BM has appeared on the magazine cover of Men's Health Korea. He was then confirmed to be joining the lineup for the SBS television series Law Of The Jungle on June 6, appearing alongside several acts including Korean entertainer Kim Byung-man, PENTAGON’s Hongseok, Hong Soo Ah, and Nature’s Saebom. The show began airing a week later on June 13.

In September, he received his first major credits as the primary songwriter, composer, and producer for the single "Dumb Litty". The title of the song was derived from usual slang words used by BM when he lived in Los Angeles. BM had previously taken part in producing Kard's music, initially through writing and composing his rap parts.

In 2020, BM was cast in the DIVE Studios variety program HWAITING!, starring alongside Ashley of Ladies' Code, Jae of Day6, Peniel of BTOB, Jamie Park and Amber Liu. The program first premiered on Facebook Watch on February 12. Since July, BM began hosting the DIVE Studios podcast Get Real alongside Peniel of BTOB and Ashley from Ladies' Code. He then featured in the track "Put It On Ya" alongside Korean rapper Nafla as part of Jessi's second EP Nuna which was released on July 30. On October 9, he appeared as an intern in the TBS show Hong Gi-mak Studio.

2021-present: Solo debut with The First Statement 
BM revealed the first teaser image for his debut solo single "Broken Me" through his Instagram account on April 29, 2021. He has stated that the song is a reflection of his internal struggles, sharing about how the track is about "fighting a war" with oneself. On June 30, DSP Media released a documentary video detailing the behind-the-scenes work of BM for his upcoming single album, The First Statement. BM then collaborated with AleXa when he featured in the music video of her single "Xtra" which was the title track of her album ReviveR released on July 1. The following day, BM released his debut single album The First Statement, with its lead single "13IVI". The First Statement is accompanied the deep house-inspired song "Body Movin'" and the Korean-language version of his debut single, "Broken Me", with BM penning the lyrics of all three tracks and also participating in the songwriting and composition for each song.

On January 21, 2022, BM released his new digital single "Lost in Euphoria".

On August 9, 2022, BM released his second single album Strangers, with its eponymous lead single. Strangers is accompanied the hip hop-inspired song "Bad Intentions", with BM penning the lyrics of all two tracks and also participating in the songwriting and composition for each song.

Other ventures 
BM went viral in March 2019 after responding to a fan's question during an Instagram Live regarding his preferred body part in working out, in which he humorously responded by referring to his chest area, eventually sparking a meme known as the "Big Tiddie Committee" after he acknowledged other male idols with a similar physique, such as Monsta X member Shownu, soloist Wonho, NU'EST's Baekho, Seventeen's Mingyu, Pentagon's Hongseok, Stray Kids's Bang Chan, The Rose's Woosung, BTS's RM, among others. After meeting a fan during the Los Angeles stop of Kard's US tour in October 2019 who revealed that she was undergoing chemotherapy for breast cancer, BM began selling "Big Tiddie Gang" merchandise through his apparel brand Staydium, with a share of the proceeds going to breast cancer research and awareness. As of April 2020, BM and Staydium have donated $20,533.75 to the Breast Cancer Research Foundation. 

Staydium launched another collaboration to raise funds for a non-profit organization in December 2020, the Healers X Staydium collection. Similar to the "Big Tiddie Gang" merchandise, part of the proceeds from this movement will go towards a non-profit organization called #STOMPOUTBULLYING.

Discography

Single albums

Singles

As featured artist

Composition credits

Filmography

Television shows

References

External links 

 
 

1992 births
Living people
South Korean male rappers
South Korean singer-songwriters
Rappers from California
South Korean male idols
K-pop singers